A limited liability company (LLC for short) is the United States-specific form of a private limited company. It is a business structure that can combine the pass-through taxation of a partnership or sole proprietorship with the limited liability of a corporation. An LLC is not a corporation under state law; it is a legal form of a company that provides limited liability to its owners in many jurisdictions. LLCs are well known for the flexibility that they provide to business owners; depending on the situation, an LLC may elect to use corporate tax rules instead of being treated as a partnership, and, under certain circumstances, LLCs may be organized as not-for-profit. In certain U.S. states (for example, Texas), businesses that provide professional services requiring a state professional license, such as legal or medical services, may not be allowed to form an LLC but may be required to form a similar entity called a professional limited liability company (PLLC).

An LLC is a hybrid legal entity having certain characteristics of both a corporation and a partnership or sole proprietorship (depending on how many owners there are). An LLC is a type of unincorporated association distinct from a corporation. The primary characteristic an LLC shares with a corporation is limited liability, and the primary characteristic it shares with a partnership is the availability of pass-through income taxation. As a business entity, an LLC is often more flexible than a corporation and may be well-suited for companies with a single owner.

Although LLCs and corporations both possess some analogous features, the basic terminology commonly associated with each type of legal entity, at least within the United States, is sometimes different. When an LLC is formed, it is said to be "organized", not "incorporated" or "chartered", and its founding document is likewise known as its "articles of organization," instead of its "articles of incorporation" or its "corporate charter". Internal operations of an LLC are further governed by its "operating agreement,"  a "member," rather than a "shareholder." Additionally, ownership in an LLC is represented by a "membership interest" or an "LLC interest" (sometimes measured in "membership units" or just "units" and at other times simply stated only as percentages), rather than represented by "shares of stock" or just "shares" (with ownership measured by the number of shares held by each shareholder). Similarly, when issued in physical rather than electronic form, a document evidencing ownership rights in an LLC is called a "membership certificate" rather than a "stock certificate".

In the absence of express statutory guidance, most American courts have held that LLC members are subject to the same common law alter ego piercing theories as corporate shareholders. However, it is more difficult to pierce the LLC veil because LLCs do not have many formalities to maintain. As long as the LLC and the members do not commingle funds, it is difficult to pierce the LLC veil. Membership interests in LLCs and partnership interests are also afforded a significant level of protection through the charging order mechanism. The charging order limits the creditor of a debtor-partner or a debtor-member to the debtor's share of distributions, without conferring on the creditor any voting or management rights.

Limited liability company members may, in certain circumstances, also incur a personal liability in cases where distributions to members render the LLC insolvent.

History 
The first state to enact a law authorizing the creation of limited liability companies was Wyoming in 1977. The law was a project of the Hamilton Brothers Oil Company, which sought to organize its business in the United States with liability and tax advantages similar to those it had obtained in Panama.

From 1960 to 1997, the classification of unincorporated business associations for the purpose of U.S. federal income tax law was governed by the "Kintner regulations," which were named after the prevailing taxpayer in the 1954 legal precedent of that name. As promulgated by the Internal Revenue Service (IRS) in 1960, the Kintner regulations set forth a complex six-factor test for determining whether such business associations would be taxed as corporations or partnerships. Some of these factors had equal significance, so that the presence of only half of them would result in classification as a partnership. Accordingly, the Wyoming Legislature tailored its statute to grant LLCs particular corporate features without exceeding this threshold.

For several years, other states were slow to adopt the LLC form because it was unclear how the IRS and courts would apply the Kintner regulations to it. After the IRS finally decided in 1988 in Revenue Ruling 88-76 that Wyoming LLCs were taxable as partnerships, other states began to take the LLC seriously and enacted their own LLC statutes.  By 1996, all 50 states had LLC statutes. In 1995, the IRS came to the conclusion that the widespread enactment of LLC statutes had undermined the Kintner regulations, and in 1996 it promulgated new regulations establishing a so-called "check the box" (CTB) entity classification election system that went into effect throughout the United States on January 1, 1997.

Flexibility and default rules
LLCs are subject to fewer regulations than traditional corporations, and thus may allow members to create a more flexible management structure than is possible with other corporate forms. As long as the LLC remains within the confines of state law, the operating agreement is responsible for the flexibility the members of the LLC have in deciding how their LLC will be governed. State statutes typically provide automatic or "default" rules for how an LLC will be governed unless the operating agreement provides otherwise, as permitted by statute in the state where the LLC was organized.

The limited liability company ("LLC") has grown to become one of the most prevalent business forms in the United States. Even the use of a single member LLC affords greater protection for the assets of the member, as compared to operating as an unincorporated entity.

Effective August 1, 2013, the Delaware Limited Liability Company Act provides that the managers and controlling members of a Delaware-domiciled limited liability company owe fiduciary duties of care and loyalty to the limited liability company and its members. Under the amendment (prompted by the Delaware Supreme Court's decision in Gatz Properties, LLC v. Auriga Capital Corp), parties to an LLC remain free to expand, restrict, or eliminate fiduciary duties in their LLC agreements (subject to the implied covenant of good faith and fair dealing).

Under 6 Del. C. Section 18-101(7), a Delaware LLC operating agreement can be written, oral or implied. It sets forth member capital contributions, ownership percentages, and management structure. Like a prenuptial agreement, an operating agreement can avoid future disputes between members by addressing buy-out rights, valuation formulas, and transfer restrictions. The written LLC operating agreement should be signed by all of its members.

Like a corporation, LLCs are required to register in the states they are "conducting (or transacting) business".  Each state has different standards and rules defining what "transacting business" means, and as a consequence, navigating what is required can be quite confusing for small business owners.  Simply forming an LLC in any state may not be enough to meet legal requirements, and specifically, if an LLC is formed in one state, but the owner (or owners) are located in another state (or states), or an employee is located in another state, or the LLC's base of operations is located in another state, the LLC may need to register as a foreign LLC in the other states it is "transacting business."

Income tax
For U.S. federal income tax purposes, an LLC is treated by default as a pass-through entity. If there is only one member in the company, the LLC is treated as a "disregarded entity" for tax purposes (unless another tax status is elected), and an individual owner would report the LLC's income or loss on Schedule C of his or her individual tax return. Thus, income from the LLC is taxed at the individual tax rates. The default tax status for LLCs with multiple members is as a partnership, which is required to report income and loss on IRS Form 1065. Under partnership tax treatment, each member of the LLC, as is the case for all partners of a partnership, annually receives a Form K-1 reporting the member's distributive share of the LLC's income or loss that is then reported on the member's individual income tax return. On the other hand, income from corporations is taxed twice: once at the corporate entity level and again when distributed to shareholders.  Thus, more tax savings often result if a business formed as an LLC rather than a corporation.

An LLC with either single or multiple members may elect to be taxed as a corporation through the filing of IRS Form 8832. After electing corporate tax status, an LLC may further elect to be treated as a regular C corporation (taxation of the entity's income prior to any dividends or distributions to the members and then taxation of the dividends or distributions once received as income by the members) or as an S corporation (entity level income and loss passes through to the members). Some commentators have recommended an LLC taxed as a S-corporation as the best possible small business structure. It combines the simplicity and flexibility of an LLC with the tax benefits of an S-corporation (self-employment tax savings).

Some legal scholars argue that corporate income taxes are intended to limit the power of corporations and to offset the legal benefits corporations enjoy, such as limited liability for their investors.  There is concern that LLCs, by combining limited liability with no entity-level taxation, could contribute to excessive risk-taking and harm to third parties.

Advantages

 Choice of tax regime. An LLC can elect to be taxed as a sole proprietor, partnership, S corporation or C corporation (as long as they would otherwise qualify for such tax treatment), providing for a great deal of flexibility.
 A limited liability company with multiple members that elects to be taxed as partnership may specially allocate the members' distributive share of income, gain, loss, deduction, or credit via the company operating agreement on a basis other than the ownership percentage of each member. S corporations may not specially allocate profits, losses and other tax items under US tax law.
 The owners of the LLC, called members, are protected from some or all liability for acts and debts of the LLC, depending on state shield laws.
 In the United States, an S corporation is limited to 100 shareholders, and all of them must be U.S. tax residents. An LLC may have an unlimited number of members, and there is no citizenship restriction.
 Much less administrative paperwork and record-keeping than a corporation.
 Pass-through taxation (i.e., no double taxation), unless the LLC elects to be taxed as a C corporation.
 Using default tax classification, profits are taxed personally at the member level, not at the LLC level.
 LLCs in most states are treated as entities separate from their members. However, in some jurisdictions such as Connecticut, case law has determined that owners were not required to plead facts sufficient to pierce the corporate veil and LLC members can be personally liable for operation of the LLC) (see, for example, the case of Sturm v. Harb Development
 LLCs in some states can be set up with just one natural person involved.
 Less risk of being "stolen" by fire-sale acquisitions (more protection against "hungry" investors).
 For some business ventures, such as real estate investment, each property can be owned by a separate LLC, thereby shielding the owners and their other properties from cross-liability.
Flexible membership: Members of an LLC may include individuals, partnerships, trusts, estates, organizations, or other business entities, and most states do not limit the type or number of members.

Disadvantages

Although there is no statutory requirement for an operating agreement in most jurisdictions, members of a multiple member LLC who operate without one may encounter problems. Unlike state laws regarding stock corporations, which are very well developed and provide for a variety of governance and protective provisions for the corporation and its shareholders, most states do not dictate detailed governance and protective provisions for the members of a limited liability company. In the absence of such statutory provisions, members of an LLC must establish governance and protective provisions pursuant to an operating agreement or similar governing document.
 It may be more difficult to raise financial capital for an LLC as investors may be more comfortable investing funds in the better-understood corporate form with a view toward an eventual IPO. One possible solution may be to form a new corporation and merge into it, dissolving the LLC and converting into a corporation.
 Many jurisdictions—including Alabama, California, Kentucky, Maryland, New York, Pennsylvania, Tennessee, and Texas—levy a franchise tax or capital values tax on LLCs. In essence, this franchise or business privilege tax is the fee the LLC pays the state for the benefit of limited liability. The franchise tax can be an amount based on revenue, an amount based on profits, or an amount based on the number of owners or the amount of capital employed in the state, or some combination of those factors, or simply a flat fee, as in Delaware.
 Effective in Texas for 2007 the franchise tax is replaced with the Texas Business Margin Tax. This is paid as: tax payable = revenues minus some expenses with an apportionment factor. In most states, however, the fee is nominal and only a handful charge a tax comparable to the tax imposed on corporations.
 In California, both foreign and domestic LLCs, corporations, and trusts, whether for-profit or non-profit—unless the entity is tax exempt—must at least pay a minimum income tax of $800 per year to the Franchise Tax Board; and no foreign LLC, corporation or trust may conduct business in California unless it is duly registered with the California Secretary of State.
 Renewal fees may also be higher. Maryland, for example, charges a stock or nonstock corporation $120 for the initial charter, and $100 for an LLC. The fee for filing the annual report the following year is $300 for stock-corporations and LLCs. The fee is zero for non-stock corporations. In addition, certain states, such as New York, impose a publication requirement upon formation of the LLC which requires that the members of the LLC publish a notice in newspapers in the geographic region that the LLC will be located that it is being formed. For LLCs located in major metropolitan areas (e.g., New York City), the cost of publication can be significant.
 The management structure of an LLC may not be clearly stated. Unlike corporations, they are not required to have a board of directors or officers. (This could also be seen as an advantage to some.)
 Taxing jurisdictions outside the US are likely to treat a US LLC as a corporation, regardless of its treatment for US tax purposes—for example a US LLC doing business outside the US or as a resident of a foreign jurisdiction. This is very likely where the country (such as Canada) does not recognize LLCs as an authorized form of business entity in that country.
 The principals of LLCs use many different titles—e.g., member, manager, managing member, managing director, chief executive officer, president, and partner. As such, it can be difficult to determine who actually has the authority to enter into a contract on the LLC's behalf.

Variations
A Professional Limited Liability Company (usually shortened as PLLC, P.L.L.C., or P.L., sometimes PLC, standing for professional limited company – not to be confused with public limited company) is a limited liability company organized for the purpose of providing professional services. Usually, professions where the state requires a license to provide services, such as a doctor, chiropractor, lawyer, accountant, architect, landscape architect, or engineer, require the formation of a PLLC. However, some states, such as California, do not permit LLCs to engage in the practice of a licensed profession. Exact requirements of PLLCs vary from state to state. Typically, a PLLC's members must all be professionals practicing the same profession. In addition, the limitation of personal liability of members does not extend to professional malpractice claims.

A Series LLC is a special form of a Limited liability company that allows a single LLC to segregate its assets into separate series. For example, a series LLC that purchases separate pieces of real estate may put each in a separate series so if the lender forecloses on one piece of property, the others are not affected.

An L3C is a for-profit, social enterprise venture that has a stated goal of performing a socially beneficial purpose, not maximizing income. It is a hybrid structure that combines the legal and tax flexibility of a traditional LLC, the social benefits of a nonprofit organization, and the branding and market positioning advantages of a social enterprise.

An anonymous Limited Liability Company is an LLC for which ownership information is not made publicly available by the state. Anonymity is possible in states that do not require the public disclosure of legal ownership of an LLC, or where an LLC's identified legal owners are another anonymous company.

See also
 Besloten vennootschap, a Belgian and Dutch private limited company
 Société à responsabilité limitée, the equivalent in French-speaking countries
 Gesellschaft mit beschränkter Haftung (German equivalent)
 Incorporation (business)
 Limited liability partnership (LLP)
 List of company registers
 List of business entities
 Unlimited company
 Wholly Foreign-Owned Enterprise
 Foreign LLC

Notes

References 

Corporate taxation in the United States
Legal entities
Types of business entity